The 1965 Oklahoma Sooners football team represented the University of Oklahoma during the 1965 NCAA University Division football season. Led by second-year head coach Gomer Jones, they played their home games at Oklahoma Memorial Stadium and competed as members of the Big Eight Conference.

A longtime assistant under Bud Wilkinson, Jones resigned after the 3–7 season, one of the worst in program history, but remained at OU as athletic director.

Jim Mackenzie, an assistant at Arkansas under Frank Broyles, was hired as head coach in December.

Schedule

Postseason

NFL draft
The following players were drafted by National Football League teams on November 27, 1965.

References

Oklahoma
Oklahoma Sooners football seasons
Oklahoma Sooners football